In mathematics, in the field of group theory, a subgroup  of a group  is termed seminormal if there is a subgroup  such that , and for any proper subgroup  of ,  is a proper subgroup of .

This definition of seminormal subgroups is due to Xiang Ying Su.

Every normal subgroup is seminormal. For finite groups, every quasinormal subgroup is seminormal.

References

Subgroup properties